Islam in Uttar Pradesh is the second largest religion in the state with 38,483,967 adherents in 2011, forming 19.26% of the total population. Muslims of Uttar Pradesh have also been referred to as Hindustani Musalman. They do not form a unified ethnic community, but are differentiated by sectarian and Baradari divisions, as well as by language and geography. Nevertheless, the community shares some unifying cultural factors. Uttar Pradesh has more Muslims than any other Muslim-majority countries in the world except Indonesia, Pakistan, Bangladesh, Nigeria, Egypt, Iran and Turkey.

History

Early history 

The earliest traces of Islam in Uttar Pradesh can be traced back to the early 11th century (1000-1030CE), when the religion was introduced to the region through various Ghurid and Ghaznavid attacks and incursions.

However, the first consolidated Muslim rule over much of Uttar Pradesh began after 1205 CE, when the region formed part of the various sultanates and was ruled from their capital, Delhi; as a result there arose a community in what is now Uttar Pradesh, referred to as Hindustani Musalmans. The term Hindustani Musalman was applied to Muslims who either converted to Islam or who had settled for a long time in India. They did not form a unified community as they were divided by ethnic, linguistic, and economic differences. When the Mongols rose to power under Genghis Khan, there was an influx of Muslim refugees into North India, many of whom settled in the provincial kasbahs and brought administrators from Iran; painters from China; theologians from Samarkand, Nishapur and Bukhara. In Azamgharh, Mubarakpur, Mau, and Vanaras, a number of cultural norms arose over time which typified many Uttar Pradesh Muslim traditions. The Turkic Sultans of Delhi and their Mughal successors patronized the émigré Muslim culture: Islamic jurists of the Sunni Hanafi school, Persian literati who were Shia Ithnā‘ashariyyah, and Sufis of several orders, including the Chishti, Qadiri and Naqshbandi.

Many Sufi missionaries from the Middle East and Central Asia migrated and settled in South Asia. Many natives converted to Islam due to the missionary Sufi saints whose dargahs populate South Asia. The Muslims from various Northern provinces such as Hyderabad Deccan, Balochistan, Sindh, Punjab, Gujarat, Kashmir and other parts of South Asia also moved to capitals of the Muslim empire in Delhi and Agra. Millions of natives converted to Islam during the Muslim rule. The Lodi dynasty was dominated by the Pashtuns soldiers from Khyber Pakhtunkhwa and Afghanistan who settled in northern India. After the First Battle of Panipat, Mughal Emperor Babur defeated the Lodi dynasty with Chagatai or Gurkani Türks, Uzbek, Turkmen and Uyghur soldiers and nobility. These soldiers and nobles were awarded estates and they settled with their families in northern India. These diverse ethnic, cultural, and linguistic groups merged  with the Muslims of Uttar Pradesh over the centuries to form the Urdu speaking Muslim community of South Asia.

The Rohilla leader Daud Khan was awarded the Katehar (later called Rohilkhand) region in the then-northern India by Mughal emperor Aurangzeb Alamgir (ruled 1658–1707) to suppress the Rajput uprisings. Originally, some 20,000 soldiers from various Pashtun tribes (Yusafzai, Ghori, Osmani, Ghilzai, Barech, Marwat, Durrani, Tareen, Kakar, Naghar, Afridi and Khattak) were hired by Mughals to provide soldiers to the Mughal armies. Their performance was appreciated by Mughal emperor Aurangzeb Alamgir, and an additional force of 25,000 Pashtuns were recruited from modern Khyber Pakhtunkhwa and Afghanistan and were given respected positions in Mughal Army. Nearly all of Pashtuns settled in the Katehar region and also brought their families from modern Khyber Pakhtunkhwa and Afghanistan. During Nadir Shah's invasion of northern India in 1739, the new wave of Pashtuns settled increasing their population to over one 1 million. Due to the large settlement of Rohilla Afghans, the Katehar region became known as Rohilkhand. Bareilly was made the capital of the Rohilkhand state and it became a major Pashtun city with Gali Nawaban as the main royal street. Other important cities included Moradabad, Rampur, Shahjahanpur, and Badaun.

The Kayastha and Manihar community were historically involved in land record keeping and accounting. Many Hindu Kayasth found favour with Muslim rulers for whom they acted as Qanungos. This close association led to the conversion of many members of the Kayastha community to Islam. The Muslim Kayasths speak Urdu and Hindi. The Kayasth sometimes use Siddiqui, Quraishi, Khan, Shaikh, Usmani and Farooqi as their surnames, and consider themselves to belong to the Shaikh community. Many of the converts belonged to the Hindu artisan castes, who were drawn to the new kasbahs. Over time, many of the artisan groups evolved into caste-like groupings, such as the Momin, who were weavers. Many of these new converts continued to speak their original dialects, such as Awadhi and Khari boli. Over time a fourfold division arose among the Ashraf, with the Sayyids (the actual or claimed descendants of the Islamic prophet, Mohammad), the Shaikh, communities signifies Arab descent and comes under high Baradari of society, however majority are the native Brahmin, Kshatriya and Vaishya clans who used the title of Sheikh after conversion to Islam, the Mughals, descendants of Central Asian Turks and Mongols and the Pathans, descendants of Pashtun tribesmen from Pakistan and Afghanistan. Occasionally, important convert communities such as the Kayastha Muslim and manihar of eastern Uttar Pradesh, were also granted Ashraf status.

In western Uttar Pradesh, there was conversion to Islam of a number of agrarian castes such as the Tyagi, Ranghar and Muley Jat. Many of these convert communities kept many of their pre-Islamic customs, such as clan exogamy. According to some scholars, this also led to the creeping into Baradari system. With the collapse of the Sultanate of Delhi, the Mughal established control and Uttar Pradesh became the heartland of their vast empire; the region was known as Hindustan, which is used to this day as the name for India in several languages. Agra and Fatehpur Sikri were the capital cities of Akbar, the Mughal emperor of India. At their zenith, during the rule of Aurangzeb, the Mughal Empire covered almost all of South Asia (including present day Afghanistan, Pakistan, India and Bangladesh), which was ruled at different times from Delhi, Agra, and Allahabad.

Later history 

When the Mughal Empire disintegrated, their territory remained confined to the Doab region and Delhi. Other areas of Hindustan (Uttar Pradesh) were ruled by different rulers: Oudh was ruled by the Shia Nawabs of Oudh, Rohilkhand by the Rohillas. The state's capital city of Lucknow was established by the Muslim Nawabs of Oudh in the 18th century. It became an important centre of Muslim culture and the development of Urdu literature.

Of all the Muslim states and dependencies of the Mughal Empire, Awadh had the newest royal family. They were descended from a Persian adventurer called Sa'adat Khan, who was originally from Khurasan in Persia, one of many Khurasanis in the service of the Mughals, mostly soldiers, who hoped for rich rewards if successful. These Khurasanis were Shia, and Lucknow became a centre of Shia culture in Uttar Pradesh.

By the early 19th century, the British had established their control over what is now Uttar Pradesh. This led to an end of almost six centuries of Muslim rule over Uttar Pradesh. 

The British began to hire indigenous cavalry in their conquered provinces. The end of Muslim rule saw a large number of unemployed Muslim horsemen, who were employed in the British army. In early British India, the cavalry was almost entirely composed of Muslims, as Hindus were "not so much disposed as the Mahomedans to the duties of a trooper". These cavalry regiments were primarily recruited among Hindustani Musalman biradaris, such as the Ranghar(Rajput Muslims), Sheikhs, Sayyids, Mughals, and localized Pathans, who made up three-fourths of the cavalry branch of the British army. Irregular cavalry regiments such as Skinner's Horse, Gardner, Hearsay's Horse and Tait's Horse preserved the traditions of cavalry under the former Mughal empire, which had a political purpose because it absorbed pockets of cavalrymen who might otherwise become disaffected plunderers. 

The British rulers created a class of feudal landowners who were generally referred to as zamindars, and in Awadh as taluqdars. Many of these large landowners provided patronage to the arts and funded many of the early Muslim educational institutions. A major educational institution was the Aligarh Muslim University, which gave its name to the Aligarh movement. Under the guidance of Sir Sayyid Ahmed Khan, the Urdu speaking Muslim elite sought to retain their position of political and administrative importance by reconciling their Mughal and Islamic culture with English education. A somewhat different educational movement was led by the Ulema of Deoband, who founded a religious school or Dar-ul-Uloom designed to revitalize Islamic learning. The aim of the Deobandis, as the movement became known as was to purge the Muslims of all strata of traditions and customs that were claimed to be Hindu. Most of the early proselytization was concentrated in the Doab region where Deoband is located, which was home to a number of peasant castes, such as the Rajput Muslim, Gujjar, Tyagi and Jat, who had maintained a number of pre-Islamic customs. A reaction to the growth of the Deobandi movement was the rise of the Barelvi sub-sect, which was much more tolerant of the customs and traditions of the local population. However, the Barelvis under Ahmed Raza Khan Barelvi opposed Hindu-Muslim unity, declaring that the Quran forbade friendship with disbelievers, warning that this could result in Muslims losing their identity. He opposed the Deobandi leaders for their political cooperation with Hindu figures, such as Gandhi. According to Ashraf Ali Thanwi the Shari'a norms mandate "distinguishing the Muslim community[qawm], the maintenance of difference in our clothing, our manners, our way of speaking, and our behavior." He forbade the wearing of the English coat and pants, tying a Dhoti[worn by Hindu men], Gurgabi shoes and Lehenga, which were "things that are purely characteristics of other communities[aqwam]".

 
The role of the Urdu language played an important role in the development of Muslim self-consciousness in the early twentieth century. Uttar Pradesh Muslims set up Anjumans or associations for the protection and promotion of Urdu. These early Muslim associations formed the core of the All India Muslim League in Dhaka in 1905. Many of the leaders belonged to the Ashraf category. Uttar Pradesh Muslims created the movement for a separate Muslim state, later known as Pakistan. The eventual effect of this movement led to the partition of India, and creation of Pakistan. This led to an exodus of many Muslim professionals to Pakistan, and the division of the Uttar Pradesh Muslims, with the formation of the Muhajir ethnic group of Pakistan. The role of the Aligarh Muslim University was extremely important in the creation of Pakistan.

Modern history 

The net result of partition and independence in 1947 was the division of the Urdu speaking Uttar Pradesh Muslims. It led to major social, political, and cultural changes; for example, Urdu lost its status. The abolishment of the zamindari system also had a profound impact on culture as these large landowners provided patronage to local artisans; this was especially true in the Awadh region. Muslim artisan communities persevered with the growth of specialized industries such as lock manufacturing in Aligarh. The Muslim peasantry in western Uttar Pradesh benefited from the Green Revolution, while those in eastern Uttar Pradesh did poorly. The Muslim League eventually declined, with most Muslims initially supporting the Indian National Congress. The post partition period saw a reduction in communal violence between Hindus and Muslims. This was also a period where Muslims were led by Ashraf leaders such as Abdul Majeed Khwaja in Aligarh and Rafi Ahmed Kidwai in Barabanki. However, from the late 1960s onwards, there was an increase in the number of communal riots, culminating in the destruction of the Babri Masjid in Ayodhya in December 1992. This period has also seen the decline of Muslim support for the Congress Party.

From the 1990s there have been two issues confronting the Muslim community: the Mandir and Mandal. Mandir refers to the construction of a Hindu temple supported by the Bharatiya Janata Party in the town of Ayodhya in eastern Uttar Pradesh, on the site of Babri Mosque. The project was poorly received and resulted in communal violence. The other issue is commonly referred to as Mandal, a reference to the Mandal Commission, which was set up to consider the question of seat reservations and quotas for people to address caste discrimination. Among the groups identified for reservation were a number of Ajlaf communities, which led to greater assertion of Ajlaf political power and a decline in the Ashraf leadership. A major controversy is a demand for the Muslim community to receive reservation as a whole, which is being opposed by many Ajlaf communities. There are also demands to extend the scheduled caste status, which the Indian Constitution restricts to Hindu castes and Muslim Ajlaf groups like the Halalkhor and Lal Begi.

Culture

Social system 

Some South Asian Muslims stratify their society according to quoms. Quoms are further divided into biradaris, which claim descent from an actual or putative common male ancestor. For example, an individual will belong to the Shaikh quom and Behlim Rangrez or Fareedi biradari. This system of stratification, unlike the Hindu caste system, lacks any concept of ritual purity or pollution.

It is commonly believed that Muslims in Uttar Pradesh are divided into the Ashraf and Ajlaf categories which are distinguished by ethnic origin and descent. However, students making empirical studies of Muslim communities in different parts of India found that this distinction is not really meaningful in understanding the existing pattern among the diverse social groups in any locality. Technically, the Ashraf are descendants of groups with foreign ancestry, while the Ajlaf are those whose ancestors are said to have converted to Islam. The Ashraf are further divided into four groups: the Sayyid, the alleged descendants of Mohammed; the Shaikh and Siddiqui Manihar claiming descent from early Arab or Persian settlers; the Turks & the Mughal descent from the Mughal dynasty or Gurkani Turks; and the Pathan, who claim descents from Pashtun groups that have settled in India. Technically the first two groups intermarry with each other, while the latter two intermarry. Included sometimes in the Ashraf category are Muslim Rajput groups such as the Rangrez, manihar and Khanzada. A third category, arzaal are supposed to be converts from Hindu Dalit communities, though the term is never used in Uttar Pradesh. Groups that tend to fall in this category include the Halalkhor and Lal Begi. Uttar Pradesh Muslims often identify themselves in smaller units called biradaris, which are localized lineage groupings; for example, the Qidwai Shaikh.

Communities in the Ajlaf category were traditionally associated with the practice of a particular craft. For example, the Ansari were weavers, while the Saifi were blacksmiths. These artisan communities call themselves biradaries and each is characterised by strict endogamy. In the older parts of town and cities in Uttar Pradesh, they are also characterised by residential segregation. Among other traditional artisan biradaris in UP are the Mansoori, Bhatiara, Bhisti, Dhobi, Muslim Halwai, Teli and Raj, which were at one time associated with a particular craft or trade.

In addition to occupational specialization, biradaris are also concentrated in a particular geographic area. For example, the Doab region is home some cultivation biradaris, such as the Baloch, Dogar, Garha, Gujjar, Jat, Turks, Kamboh, Rajput, and Muslim Tyagi. They often live in their own villages and follow distinct customs. Almost all these groups are Sunni and speak Kauravi.

The population is further divided by linguistic division. Muslims in Uttar Pradesh speak Urdu, as well as also local Hindi dialects, such as Bhojpuri, Awadhi, Kauravi, and Braj Bhasha.

Dress

Both Muslim men and women wore the shalwar kameez, while men also wore the sherwani. Indian Muslim women in urban areas historically also wore a white purdah, which hung around the figure around a small skull-cap.

Cuisine 

The Mughal and Indo-Iranian heritage influenced their cuisine, having tastes vary from mild to spicy and is often associated with aroma. It tends to use stronger spices and flavors. Most of a dastarkhawan dining table includes chapatti, rice, dal, vegetable and meat (beef, lamb, chicken, fish) dishes. Special dishes include biryani, qorma, kofta, seekh kabab, Nihari and Haleem, Nargisi Koftay, Shashlik, Kata-Kat, Roghani Naan, Naan, Sheer khurma (sweet), qourma, chai (sweet, milky tea), paan, and other delicacies associated with North Indian Muslim culture.

Sufi orders 

Sufis (Islamic mystics) played an important role in the spread of Islam in India. They were successful in spreading Islam, as many aspects of Sufi belief systems and practices had their parallels in Indian philosophical literature, in particular nonviolence and monism. The Sufis' orthodox approach towards Islam made it easier for Hindus to practice. Hazrat Khawaja Muin-ud-din Chishti, Qutbuddin Bakhtiar Kaki, syed jalaluddin surkh posh bukhariNizam-ud-din Auliya, Shah Jalal, nasiruddin chirag Dehlvi , makhdoom jahaniya jahangasht, syed sadruddin raju qattalAmir Khusro, Sarkar Sabir Pak, Shekh Alla-ul-Haq Pandwi, Hazrat Qutabuddin Dehlvi, Hazrat Nasiruddin kaaly, Hazrat Jamal Shah Khurma Waly, Hazrat Shah Ahmad Shah Pir Ji Sarkar, Hazrat Syed Chishti Miyan (Muradabad), Hazrat Imam Shah Chishti, Ashraf Jahangir Semnani, Sarkar Waris Pak, and Ata Hussain Fani Chishti trained Sufis to propagate Islam in different parts of India. When the Islamic Empire was established in India, the Sufi movement attracted followers from the artisan and untouchable communities; they assisted in bridging the distance between Islam and the indigenous traditions. Ahmad Sirhindi, a prominent member of the Naqshbandi Sufi, advocated the peaceful conversion of Hindus to Islam. Ahmed Rida Khan contributed a lot by defending traditional and orthodox Islam in India through his work Fatawa Razvia.

Demographics

Population by district 

The following table gives the proportion of Muslims in the population of every district in Uttar Pradesh according to the 2011 Census. Excluded are the districts of Hapur, Sambhal and Shamli which did not exist at the time of the census.

Language 

Urdu has much in common with the Hindustani language and is mutually intelligible with Standard Hindi. The grammatical description in this article concerns standard Urdu. During the Mughal Empire, the development of Urdu was further strengthened and started to emerge as a new language. The official language of the Ghurids, Delhi Sultanate, the Mughal Empire, and their successor states, as well as the cultured language of poetry and literature, was Persian, while the language of religion was Arabic. Gradually, the need to communicate with local inhabitants led to a composition of Sanskrit-derived languages, written in the Perso-Arabic script with literary conventions and specialized vocabulary being retained from Persian, Arabic, and Turkic; the new standard was eventually called Urdu.

According to the Tashih Gharaib-ul-Lughat by Khan-i Arzu, the "zaban-e Urdu-e Shahi [the Imperial Urdu] had attained special importance in the time of Alamgir"(1658-1707). During this time period, Urdu was referred to as "Moors" by European writers, such as the English priest John Ovington in 1689 after his visit to India:

The language of the Moors is different from that of the ancient original inhabitants of India, but is oblig'd to these Gentiles for its characters. For though the Moors dialect is peculiar to themselves, yet it is destitute of Letters to express it; and therefore in all their Writings in their Mother Tongue, they borrow their letters from the Heathens, or from the Persians, or other Nations.

Urdu is often contrasted with Hindi, another standardised form of Hindustani. The main differences between the two are that Standard Urdu is conventionally written in the Nastaliq calligraphy style of the Perso-Arabic script and draws vocabulary from Persian, Arabic, Turkish and local languages while Standard Hindi is conventionally written in Devanāgarī and draws vocabulary from Sanskrit  more heavily. Most linguists consider Urdu and Hindi to be two standardized forms of the same language; others classify them separately, while some consider any differences to be sociolinguistic. Mutual intelligibility decreases in literary and specialized contexts. Due to religious nationalism since the partition of British India and consequent continued communal tensions, native speakers of both Hindi and Urdu increasingly assert them to be completely distinct languages.

Urdu's vocabulary remains heavily influenced by the Persian language. Since the 1800s, English started to replace Persian as the official language in India and it also contributed to influence the Urdu language. As of today, Urdu's vocabulary is strongly influenced by the English language.

Controversy over reservations 

Studies including the Sachar Report have claimed that the Muslim community in Uttar Pradesh lags behind in terms of economics, educational attainment and political representation. The general political consensus in India has been, for a number of historic reasons, that the Muslim community as whole should not be subject to any affirmative action policies, such as other socially deprived groupings like the Scheduled Castes. However, the state has conceded that certain baradaris within the larger Muslim community of Uttar Pradesh deserve reservations in jobs and quotas in educational institutions. This principle has been established by the Mandal Commission.

Many of these baradaris that have been traditionally associated with a particular craft have been granted Other Backward Class (OBC) status, which in theory makes them eligible for a number of affirmative action schemes. There has been some criticism as the selection of criteria, which many disadvantaged Muslim Baradaris excluded from the lists drawn up by the Government of India. For example, certain Baradaris whose Hindu counterparts were lists as Scheduled Castes were omitted from the first Uttar Pradeh list. This was part dealt with by including Muslim Nats, Muslim Mochis and Muslim Dhobis, whose Hindu counterparts have Scheduled Caste status as backward communities. However, a number of extremely marginalized Muslim communities such as the Muslim Dabgar. Muslim Bandhmatis. Muslim Dom and Muslim Bansphor remain excluded despite the fact that there Hindu counterparts are on the Scheduled Caste list. Other economically deprived groups such as the Kankali, Kanmailia and Kingharia have also been excluded, while groups like the Kayastha Muslims and Muslim Kamboh have been included. Approximately 44 communities have been included in the Uttar Pradesh OBC list.

The Government of India made an announcement to establish a sub-quota of 4.5% for minorities within the existing 27% reservation meant for the OBC. This decision was said to be made to address Muslim communities that have been granted OBC status are unable to compete with wealthier section of the Hindu OBC community. However, Justice Sachar who headed the Sachar Committee criticized the government decision saying, "Such promises will not help the backward section of minorities. It is like befooling them. These people are making tall claims just to win elections"

Notable people 
Notable Muslims from Uttar Pradesh include actress Shabana Azami, Vice President of India Mohammad Hamid Ansari, Vice President of Muslim Personal Law Board Dr. Kalbe Sadiq, actor and director Muzaffar Ali, journalist Saeed Naqvi, Persian scholar Dr. Naiyer Masud Rizvi, linguist Masud Husain Khan, Governor Syed Sibtey Razi, historian Irfan Habib, politician Salman Khursheed, and cricketer Mohammad Kaif.

See also 

Islam in India
States of India by Urdu speakers
Islam in West Bengal

References 

Uttar Pradesh

Religion in Uttar Pradesh
Social groups of Pakistan
Urdu

id:Islam di Uttar Pradesh